Enanthem or enanthema is a rash (small spots) on the mucous membranes. It is characteristic of patients with viral infections causing hand foot and mouth disease, measles, and sometimes chicken pox, or COVID-19. In addition, bacterial infections such as Scarlet fever may also be a cause of enanthema. The aforementioned diseases usually present with exanthema and enanthema.

Enanthema can also indicate hypersensitivity.

See also
 Koplik's spots
 Strawberry tongue
 Forchheimer spots

References

External links 

Symptoms and signs: Skin and subcutaneous tissue